= Ardistama =

Town of ancient Cappadocia

Coordinates: 37°55′45″N 33°51′24″E

Ardistama, also known as Arissama, was a town of ancient Cappadocia, inhabited by Hittites in Hellenistic, Roman, and Byzantine times. It was discovered in 1904 by Thomas Callander. Its name may have been derived from Angdisis or Angdistis.

Its site is located near Kale Tepe, Asiatic Turkey.
